Velimir Kljaić (10 February 1946 – 12 August 2010) was a Croatian handball player and coach.

Career
As a player Kljaić played with RK Medveščak Zagreb and Klagenfurt. As a coach, he won two Croatian championships with RK Zagreb and one Cup. In Germany he was the Coach of the Year in 1992, in which he won German championship and the Cup with SG Wallau-Massenheim.

As head coach of Croatia men's team he won the gold medal in the 1996 Summer Olympics.

He was also head coach of the national teams of Egypt and Kuwait.

Personal life
Kljaić was born in the village of Danilo Gornje, administrative part of Šibenik. He was the father of the former handballer Nenad Kljaić who was a part of Croatia's squad in the 1996 Summer Olympics in Atlanta. 

Velimir Kljaić died on 12 August 2010 of lung cancer in Zagreb. He was buried five days after his death in Zagreb.

Honours

Player
Medveščak
Yugoslav First League 
Winner (1): 1966
Yugoslav Cup 
Winner (1): 1970
European Champions Cup 
Finalist (1): 1964–65

Manager
Medveščak
Yugoslav Cup 
Winner (1): 1981

Wallau-Massenheim
Bundesliga 
Winner (1): 1991–92
IHF Cup 
Winner (1): 1992

Croatia
1996 Summer Olympics – 1st place

Zagreb
First A League
Winner (1): 1998–99
Croatian Cup 
Winner (1): 1999
EHF Champions League 
Finalist (1): 1998–99

Egypt
2000 African Championship – 1st place

Kuwait
2002 Asian Championship – 1st place

Gummersbach
EHF Champions Trophy 
Finalist (1): 2006

Individual
Handball Manager of the Year in Germany – 1992
The most successful athlete promoter of Croatia in the world: 1996
Franjo Bučar State Award for Sport – 1996, 2010 (posthumously)
Best Croatian coach of 1997 by Croatian Handball Federation
Best Croatian coach of 1997 by Sportske novosti
Best Croatian coach of 1999 by Croatian Handball Federation
Best Croatian coach of 1999 by Sportske novosti

References

1946 births
2010 deaths
Yugoslav male handball players
Croatian male handball players
Croatian handball coaches
Olympic coaches
Deaths from lung cancer
RK Zagreb coaches